Mental examination or mental exam may refer to:
 Psychological evaluation
 Mental status examination